Purmela is an unincorporated community in Coryell County, Texas, United States. The community is part of the Killeen–Temple–Fort Hood Metropolitan Statistical Area. Purmela has a post office with the ZIP code 76566.

Climate
The climate in this area is characterized by hot, humid summers and generally mild to cool winters.  According to the Köppen climate classification system, Purmela has a humid subtropical climate, Cfa on climate maps.

References

External links
 

Unincorporated communities in Coryell County, Texas
Unincorporated communities in Texas